Felix Healy (born 27 September 1955 as Patrick Joseph Healy) is a former Northern Ireland international footballer and singer who played for Coleraine and then became a football manager. He has also worked as a media pundit and is currently part of the management team at First Division club Finn Harps, taking on the role of Director of football alongside manager Peter Hutton.

Starting his career at Sligo Rovers, he signed with Distillery in 1976. In 1978, he transferred to Finn Harps, before moving to England to play for Port Vale later that year. He returned to his homeland two years later to play for Coleraine. After seven years with the club he moved on to Derry City. In 1993, he returned to Coleraine as player-manager, before leaving his post and ending his playing career in 1994. He then four years in charge at Derry City. In 1982, he won four caps for Northern Ireland. Healy settled into a quiet retirement, becoming a very popular local musician around Derry City and Inishowen.

Club career
Healy began his career in the Sligo Rovers first-team as a teenager, before he transferred to Distillery in 1976. The club were suffering and without a ground and Healy did not even spend a full season with the club as results continually went against them. In March 1977 he was back in the League of Ireland with Finn Harps.

He matured as a player with Harps, his impressive performances helped to bring home runners-up medals in the League of Ireland and Tyler All-Ireland Cup. In October 1978, English club Port Vale paid £8,000 for his services. He played two seasons of Fourth Division football before returning across the Irish Sea, after being signed by Coleraine manager Victor Hunter in July 1980. His form with the "Bannsiders" during the 1981–82 campaign brought the club to the verge of an Irish League and Cup double, before they lost out to Linfield on both fronts. The disappointment was eased by an Ulster Footballer of the Year award, and a call-up to the Northern Ireland squad. His continued good form with Coleraine over the following seasons brought Healy an Ulster Cup winner's medal and another Irish Cup final appearance, though his successful penalty proved to not be enough to prevent Glentoran winning the 1986 final by a 2–1 scoreline.

During his time at Coleraine he played in eight European ties, scoring on two separate occasions in the UEFA Cup in September 1983 and September 1986 against Sparta Rotterdam and FC Stahl Brandenburg.

In 1987, Healy moved to his hometown club, Derry City, where he won a clean-sweep of League Championship, FAI Cup (where he scored the only goal in the final) and League of Ireland Cup, (a domestic treble) in 1988–89; the club's first major honours since their days in the Irish League, over twenty years earlier. He also scored Derry's first ever goal in the Premier Division on 20 September 1987. He scored 38 goals in 162 total appearances for his home town club.

International career
Healy made his international debut in an experimental line-up which drew with Scotland in the British Home Championship, and won his second cap the following month as Northern Ireland finished their World Cup preparations in the worst of fashions, with a 3–0 defeat by Wales. Healy did enough to impress Billy Bingham, who included him in the 1982 World Cup squad for Spain. He played once at the finals, coming on as substitute for Martin O'Neill in a 1–1 draw with Honduras. In doing so he became the first and so far only Irish League player to play in a World Cup Finals match. He won his fourth and final cap in the first post-World Cup game, Northern Ireland losing 2–0 in Austria.

He was a regular choice for the Irish League, and he won three caps – in a 3–3 draw with OFK Beograd (representing the Yugoslav League) in 1982, and twice against the League of Ireland, a 4–0 win (in which he scored) in 1984 and a 2–1 defeat in 1986.

Management career
In October 1993 Healy returned to Coleraine as player-manager, taking over from Willie McFaul and back to Derry as manager in December 1994. In a little under four seasons in charge at the Brandywell Stadium, Healy led Derry to League and FAI Cup successes, before resigning in 1998. Healy remained outside football until becoming a surprise appointment as Finn Harps boss in May 2004. Lifting the club out of the doldrums, his first season at Finn Park saw the club promoted as champions of the First Division. However the club struggled to make an impact in the Premier League the following season and he was sacked in July 2005.

Other work
Whilst playing in Northern Ireland, Healy served a four-year apprenticeship as a butcher, and spent his nights as a club singer. He appeared as a football pundit on Setanta Sports and as Station Manager for Drive105.3FM, also acting as a sports reporter for local network, Channel 9. He once starred in a local production of Grease and sang numerous club-songs for Derry during his time there.

Personal life
Healy has three children; Alan, Georgina and Patrick. Patrick was a mascot for Derry City in the 1989 FAI Cup final when Felix scored the winning goal.

Career statistics

Honours

As a player
Individual
Northern Ireland Football Writers' Association Player of the Year: 1981–82
Ulster Footballer of the Year: 1981–82

Coleraine
Ulster Cup: 1986, 1987
Irish Cup runner-up: 1982, 1986

Derry City
League of Ireland Premier Division: 1988–89
FAI Cup: 1989; runner-up: 1989
League of Ireland Cup: 1989, 1991; runner-up: 1990

As a manager
Derry City
League of Ireland Premier Division: 1996–97
FAI Cup: 1995

Finn Harps
League of Ireland First Division: 2004

References

1955 births
Living people
Sportspeople from Derry (city)
Association footballers from Northern Ireland
Expatriate association footballers from Northern Ireland
Northern Ireland international footballers
Irish League representative players
League of Ireland XI players
Association football midfielders
Association football forwards
Sligo Rovers F.C. players
Lisburn Distillery F.C. players
Finn Harps F.C. players
Port Vale F.C. players
Coleraine F.C. players
Derry City F.C. players
English Football League players
League of Ireland players
Expatriate association footballers in the Republic of Ireland
NIFL Premiership players
1982 FIFA World Cup players
Ulster Footballers of the Year
Northern Ireland Football Writers' Association Players of the Year
Football managers from Northern Ireland
Derry City F.C. managers
League of Ireland managers
Musicians from Derry (city)